Muhammad Fitri bin Omar (born 25 June 1985) is a Malaysian professional footballer who plays as a left back for Malaysia Premier League side Kelantan United.

Fitri played at the now defunct club MP Muar as a striker, where he was the top scorer and Golden Boot winner of 2011 Malaysia Premier League with 16 goals. He made his international debut in a friendly match against China PR in October 2013.

Club career

Kelantan
In April 2014, during the second transfer window, Fitri signed a contract with Kelantan. He made his debut for Kelantan during the match against Johor Darul Ta'zim after a substitution for Shakir Ali who injured in the first half. His side loses 1–2 after a goal from Fazly Mazlan at the last minute. On 18 April 2014, he was seen had a fight with Sarawak player Muamer Salibašić during the match between Kelantan vs Sarawak which ended with Kelantan lose to Sarawak 0–1, Sarawak win by the only goal scored by Ryan Griffiths.

Kedah
On 2 December 2016, Fitri left Penang and signed one-year contract with Kedah for 2017 season.

Career statistics

Club

International

Honours

Club
ATM
Malaysia Premier League: 2012
Malaysia Charity Shield: 2013
Malaysia Cup: Runner-up 2012

Kelantan
Malaysia FA Cup: Runner-up 2009, 2015

Kedah
Malaysia Charity Shield: 2017
Malaysian FA Cup: 2017

Individual
MP Muar FC
 2011 Malaysia Premier League: Golden Boot winner (16 goals), as a striker of MP Muar.

References

External links
 

1985 births
Living people
People from Selangor
Malaysian people of Malay descent
Malaysian footballers
Malaysia international footballers
Johor Darul Ta'zim F.C. players
Kelantan FA players
ATM FA players
Penang F.C. players
Kedah Darul Aman F.C. players
Malaysia Super League players
Association football defenders
Kelantan United F.C. players